The Guirá State Park is a State park in the state of Mato Grosso, Brazil.

Location

The Guirá State Park ia in the municipality of Cáceres in the south of Mato Grosso, on the border with Bolivia.
It is in the Pantanal biome, and has a large population of deer.
It adjoins the Pantanal Matogrossense National Park to the south.

History

It was justified by FEMA as essential for preserving the Pantanal ecosystem, threatened by human activities.
The Guirá State Park was created by Mato Grosso Governor Dante Martins De Oliveira, who approved law 7.625 of 15 January 2002.

The park is administered by the State Environmental Foundation.
The objective is to preserve existing ecosystems and allow controlled public use, education and scientific research.
On 17 October 2014 SEMA called on owners of land in the park to present their documents to allow regularization.
The consultative council was created on 15 December 2014.

Notes

Sources

State parks of Brazil
Protected areas established in 2002
2002 establishments in Brazil
Protected areas of Mato Grosso